Tthejëre Ghaı̨lı̨ 196B, also known as Salt River, is an Indian reserve of the Smith's Landing First Nation in Alberta, located within the Regional Municipality of Wood Buffalo.

References

Indian reserves in Alberta